Paxson may refer to:

People 
Paxson (surname)

Places 
Paxson, Alaska
Paxson, Virginia
Paxson, Alberta

Other 
 Paxson Communications, former name of ION Media Networks

See also
 Paxon (disambiguation)
 Paxton (disambiguation)